Catherine Naglestad, born in San Jose of Scandinavian parentage, and grew up in the San Francisco Bay Area, is an American soprano singer.

She earned her Bachelor of Music from the San Francisco Conservatory, furthering her studies in Rome, Milan and New York. She has performed leading roles in opera houses and concert halls around the world, including the Royal Opera House in London, Paris Opéra Bastille, Berlin State Opera, and Suntory Hall in Tokyo. She is particularly known for the roles of Norma and Alceste.

References

Opera japonica interview with Ruth C Jacobs, 2005, accessed 4 June 2010

American operatic sopranos
Living people
San Francisco Conservatory of Music alumni
Singers from California
1965 births
Classical musicians from California
21st-century American women